Robert Boehringer (30 July 1884, in Winnenden – 9 August 1974, in Geneva) was a German industrialist and poet.

Boehringer was the son of a factory owner. He spent his childhood, youth, and his student years in Basel, where he also had his Ph.D. approved at the local university. Until 1920 he was the head of the family firm C.H. Boehringer in Ingelheim. From 1931 he took part in the establishment of Hoffmann-La Roche in Basel. In 1930 he settled in Geneva.

After the outbreak of World War II Boehringer gave up his German citizenship and became a Swiss national. He founded the Commission mixte de Secours de la Croix Rouge Internationale and after the war he worked for J. R. Geigy AG.

From about 1905 Boehringer became a member of the circle of Stefan George and one of his most trusted friends. After George's death Boehringer became inheritor and administrator of George's estate. In 1959 he established the Stefan George Foundation and the Stefan George Archive.

Works by Boehringer: „Über das Leben von Gedichten“, „Bildnisse und Nachweise“ and „Das Antlitz des Genius“.

Boehringers papers are held by the German Federal Archives.

Literature
Boehringer, Robert: Gedenken an Robert Boehringer, Stefan-George-Stiftung, Stuttgart 1994. Ed. Michael Stettler.

External links
Short biography, City of Ingelheim 

1884 births
1974 deaths
People from Winnenden
Businesspeople from Basel-Stadt
Boehringer Ingelheim people
Red Cross personnel
Naturalised citizens of Switzerland
Commanders Crosses of the Order of Merit of the Federal Republic of Germany
German male writers
German emigrants to Switzerland